Urmia is a city in and the capital of West Azerbaijan Province, Iran, but may also refer to one of these:

Lake Urmia, a salt lake in northwestern Iran
Urmia County, a county in West Azerbaijan Province in Iran
Urmia University, a major university in the city of Urmia
Urmia Airport, an airport in Urmia